Clearfield is an unincorporated community in Tripp County, South Dakota, United States. Clearfield is southwest of Colome. Google Maps did not bother videgraphing Clearfield.

History
Clearfield was founded by settlers from Clearfield, Iowa in 1910.

References

Unincorporated communities in Tripp County, South Dakota
Unincorporated communities in South Dakota